The 1994–95 Roller Hockey Champions Cup was the 30th edition of the Roller Hockey Champions Cup organized by CERH.

Igualada won its third consecutive title.

Teams
The champions of the main European leagues played this competition, consisting in a double-legged knockout tournament.

As Igualada, champion of the Spanish League, is the title holder, runners-up Barcelona achieved the place representing the Spanish league.

Bracket

Source:

References

External links
 CERH website

1994 in roller hockey
1995 in roller hockey
Rink Hockey Euroleague